Milan Peter Sova (September 25, 1944 – August 27, 2020) was a Czech-born American cinematographer. 

Sova was born in Prague, Czechoslavakia. After training to be a machinist in Prague, Sova would emigrate to New York City, where he worked fixing cameras at ABC.

Sova's first work as cinematographer was on the 1977 film Short Eyes. Through his career he would collaborate frequently with Barry Levinson and Paul McGuigan, and would work with Mike Newell on the gangster film Donnie Brasco. He became a member of the American Society of Cinematographers in 1999.

He was married to his wife Elizabeth from 1988 until her death in 2018. They had one son together. Sova died in South Kortright, New York on August 27, 2020, at the age of 75.

Filmography

Film

Television
TV movies

TV series

References

External links
Peter Sova at the Internet Movie Database

1944 births
2020 deaths
American cinematographers
Artists from Prague
Czech cinematographers
Czechoslovak emigrants to the United States